Dundas Street bus rapid transit is a proposed bus rapid transit (BRT) corridor proposed by Metrolinx for the western part of the Greater Toronto and Hamilton Area in Southern Ontario, Canada. It is part of the regional transportation plan The Big Move.  Metrolinx currently refers to the project as Dundas bus rapid transit without the word "Street". The City of Mississauga used the brand Dundas Connects during the development phase.

The Dundas BRT is planned to run along Dundas Street from the Kipling Transit Hub at Kipling station on Line 2 Bloor–Danforth in Etobicoke, Toronto to Highway 6 in the neighbourhood of Waterdown in Hamilton, passing through the cities of Mississauga, Oakville, and Burlington. The BRT would also make connections with GO Transit's Milton line and the future Hurontario LRT.

Mississauga
, Metrolinx has proposed eight BRT stops along Dundas Street between Wharton Way and Confederation Parkway.

Metrolinx has identified two pinch points along the BRT within Mississauga at Cooksville and Erindale Valley. The BRT right-of-way in Cookville between Jaguar Valley Drive and Confederation Parkway is constrained by buildings (including some heritage properties) located close to the street. Metrolinx prefers constructing six lanes on Dundas Street through Cooksville with the two centre lanes reserved for buses.

The Erindale Valley has a pinch point due to the need to protect the environment around the Credit River Valley and Erindale Park. There are also several heritage sites between The Credit Woodlands and Mississauga Road.

On March 5, 2022, Prime Minister Justin Trudeau, along with Mississauga Mayor Bonnie Crombie and Ontario's Associate Minister of Transportation Stan Cho, announced a  joint investment for transit projects in Mississauga that includes funding for the Dundas BRT.

Burlington
A 2008 Metrolinx report proposed that the Dundas BRT have its western terminus at Brant Street in Burlington, where it would connect to a proposed Brant Street bus rapid transit proceeding south to Burlington GO Station. However, the current webpage for the Dundas BRT makes no mention of a Brant Street BRT, and the proposed western terminal of the Dundas BRT is Highway 6 in Hamilton.

See also
Durham–Scarborough bus rapid transit

References

External links
 Dundas BRT, Metrolinx project page

The Big Move projects
Proposed public transport in the Greater Toronto Area